Juan de Cervantes (c. 1380 or 1382 in Seville, Spain – 25 November 1453, buried in Seville Cathedral) was a Cardinal of the Catholic Church. 

Cervantes studied at the University of Salamanca and obtained a doctorate in civil and canon law and a magister in theology. He was made Archdeacon of Calatrava by Antipope Benedict XIII on 29 January 1415, Archdeacon of Sevilla in 1419, Papal referandary, Canon of Burgos and Abbot of Salas in Burgos in 1420. At the Council of Siena (1423–1424), he defended the Pope. He was chosen as a Cardinal by Pope Martin V in May 1426.

During the reign of Pope Eugene IV, Cervantes was active at the Council of Basel, eventually backing the Pope against the majority of the council's fathers.

Cervantes is buried in the Sepulcher of Cardinal Juan de Cervantes in the Seville Cathedral. His tomb was sculpted by Lorenzo Mercadante, which was finished around 1458.

References

15th-century Castilian cardinals
Cardinal-bishops of Ostia
1453 deaths
People from Seville
University of Salamanca alumni
1380s births